Fabrizio Maria Pratticò (born 25 May 1990) is an Italian footballer who plays as a goalkeeper for Italian club Gallico Catona.

Career
Pratticò was a youth player with Reggina 1914 and started his senior career with A.S. Pescina Valle del Giovenco. After that, he played for HinterReggio Calcio, Melitese, and A.S.D. Sorrento but had to go down to the Eccellenza with ASD Gallico Catona because of injury. In 2014, he signed for Syrianska in the Swedish Superettan until December that year after a trial, where he made one league appearance off the bench, started in the domestic cup and scored zero goals. In 2015, he signed for Western United in the Solomon Islands Telekom S-League, where he made three appearances and scored zero goals in the OFC Champions League and won the domestic championship. Despite being offered a contract extension until 2016, after a failed transfer to Hungary, Pratticò instead signed for Vestri in the Icelandic 1. deild karla through goalkeeper Giacomo Ratto, where he made three league appearances and scored zero goals. However, they were relegated at the end of the season and he received offers from Australia, New Zealand, and Fiji. In 2016, he returned to ASD Gallico Catona before re-signing for Western United. However, he failed to make a single appearances in the OFC Champions League that season. In 2017, he signed for Guadalcanal, who also competed in the Solomon Islands Telekom S-League. In 2018, he returned for the third time to ASD Gallico Catona, where he now plays.

References

External links
 
 
 
 
 

1990 births
Living people
Italian footballers
Sportspeople from Reggio Calabria
Association football goalkeepers
Reggina 1914 players
A.C.N. Siena 1904 players
A.S.D. Sorrento players
Syrianska FC players
Western United F.C. players
Vestri (football club) players
FC Guadalcanal players
Serie D players
Eccellenza players
Superettan players
1. deild karla players
Italian expatriate footballers
Expatriate footballers in Sweden
Italian expatriate sportspeople in Sweden
Expatriate footballers in the Solomon Islands
Expatriate footballers in Iceland
Footballers from Calabria